Lathys is a genus of  cribellate araneomorph spiders in the family Dictynidae, and was first described by Eugène Simon in 1884. It is a replacement name for "Lethia" Menge, 1869 because that name was already in use as a synonym for a genus of moths.

Species
 it contains fifty-two species:
L. adunca Liu, 2018 – China
L. affinis (Blackwall, 1862) – Madeira, Portugal?
L. alberta Gertsch, 1946 – USA, Canada, Russia (South Siberia to Far East)
L. albida Gertsch, 1946 – USA
L. ankaraensis Özkütük, Marusik, Elverici & Kunt, 2016 – Turkey
L. annulata Bösenberg & Strand, 1906 – Korea, Japan
L. bin Marusik & Logunov, 1991 – Russia (Kurile Is.)
L. borealis Zhang, Hu & Zhang, 2012 – China
L. brevitibialis Denis, 1956 – Morocco
L. cambridgei (Simon, 1874) – Israel
L. changtunesis Hu, 2001 – China
L. chishuiensis Zhang, Yang & Zhang, 2009 – China
L. coralynae Gertsch & Davis, 1942 – Mexico
L. delicatula (Gertsch & Mulaik, 1936) – USA
L. deltoidea Liu, 2018 – China
L. dentichelis (Simon, 1883) – Azores, Canary Is.
L. dihamata Paik, 1979 – Korea, Japan
L. dixiana Ivie & Barrows, 1935 – USA
L. fibulata Liu, 2018 – China
L. foxi (Marx, 1891) – USA
L. heterophthalma Kulczyński, 1891 – Europe, Russia (Europe to West Siberia)
L. huangyangjieensis Liu, 2018 – China
L. humilis (Blackwall, 1855) (type) – Europe to Caucasus and Iran
Lathys h. meridionalis (Simon, 1874) – Spain, France (mainland, Corsica), North Africa
L. immaculata (Chamberlin & Ivie, 1944) – USA
L. inaffecta Li, 2017 – China
L. insulana Ono, 2003 – Japan
L. jubata (Denis, 1947) – France
L. lehtineni Kovblyuk, Kastrygina & Omelko, 2014 – Ukraine, Russia (Europe)
L. lepida O. Pickard-Cambridge, 1909 – Spain
L. lutulenta Simon, 1914 – France
L. maculina Gertsch, 1946 – USA
L. maculosa (Karsch, 1879) – Korea, Japan
L. mallorcensis Lissner, 2018 – Spain (Majorca)
L. maura (Simon, 1911) – Algeria
L. narbonensis (Simon, 1876) – France, Italy
L. pallida (Marx, 1891) – USA, Canada
L. pygmaea Wunderlich, 2011 – Canary Is.
L. sexoculata Seo & Sohn, 1984 – Korea, Japan
L. sexpustulata (Simon, 1878) – France, Morocco
L. simplicior (Dalmas, 1916) – Algeria
L. sindi (Caporiacco, 1934) – Karakorum
L. spasskyi Andreeva & Tyschchenko, 1969 – Turkey, Azerbaijan, Kazakhstan, Uzbekistan, Kyrgyzstan, Tajikistan
L. spiralis Zhang, Hu & Zhang, 2012 – China
L. stigmatisata (Menge, 1869) – Europe, Turkey
L. subalberta Zhang, Hu & Zhang, 2012 – China
L. subhumilis Zhang, Hu & Zhang, 2012 – China
L. subviridis Denis, 1937 – Algeria
L. sylvania Chamberlin & Gertsch, 1958 – USA
L. teideensis Wunderlich, 1992 – Canary Is.
L. truncata Danilov, 1994 – Russia (Central Asia, South Siberia), Kazakhstan
L. zhanfengi Liu, 2018 – China

References

External links

Araneomorphae genera
Dictynidae
Taxa named by Eugène Simon